Armourdale was a provincial riding in Ontario, Canada. It was represented in the Legislative Assembly of Ontario from the 1963 provincial election until it was eliminated in 1987, when most of its territory was incorporated into the ridings of Wilson Heights, Willowdale, and York Mills. Armourdale was created from part of the former riding of York Centre. It was in the former borough of North York and occupied an area to the west of Yonge Street and east of Bathurst Street.

Three Members of Provincial Parliament represented the riding during its history. The most notable was Philip Givens who was a former mayor of Toronto. He ran in 1975 against Mel Lastman who went on to become mayor of North York and Toronto.

Members of Provincial Parliament

Electoral results

References

Notes

Citations

Former provincial electoral districts of Ontario
Provincial electoral districts of Toronto